Simon Schobel (born February 22, 1950) is a former Romanian handball player who competed in the 1972 Summer Olympics.

In 1972 he won the bronze medal with the Romanian team. He played all six matches and scored two goals.

In 1973 he defected to West Germany after a game that his team Universitatea Cluj had played there.

In 2004 he was arrested on suspicion of tax evasion, and released in January 2005.

In 1982 he was appointed manager of the German men's national handball team, at 32 the youngest ever.

As of 2012, he was again living in Romania.

Footnotes

References
 Lexikon der Handballer, Komet Verlag, S.200,

External links
 
 

1950 births
Living people
Romanian male handball players
Handball players at the 1972 Summer Olympics
Olympic handball players of Romania
Olympic bronze medalists for Romania
Olympic medalists in handball
German people of German-Romanian descent
Medalists at the 1972 Summer Olympics